Now Hear This is the second and final studio album by hard rock band Howe II, released in 1991 through Shrapnel Records. Following the album's release, guitarist Greg Howe would re-focus on his solo career, beginning with his 1993 album Introspection.

Critical reception

Andy Hinds at AllMusic gave Now Hear This 2.5 stars out of 5, calling it "a more slickly produced offering than the early Van Halen inspired High Gear album", but otherwise "a disappointment; it sounds like a band that desperately wants mainstream success, even at the expense of its core values." He criticized the album for being "a blatant bid for stardom" and some of the songs as sounding "a bit muted this time around." Nonetheless he praised Greg's guitar playing, and listed "Crowd Pleaser" and "Motherlode" as highlights.

Track listing

Personnel
Albert Howe – lead vocals
Greg Howe – guitar, background vocals, production
Mike Mani – keyboard
Kevin Soffera – drums, background vocals
Vern Parsons – bass, background vocals
Steve Fontano – engineering, production
Shawn Michael Morris – engineering
Paul Stubblebine – mastering
Mike Varney – production

References

Greg Howe albums
1991 albums
Shrapnel Records albums
Albums produced by Mike Varney